

The Caudron C.510 Pélican was a 1930s French air ambulance or touring monoplane. Designed and built by Caudron and based on the earlier Caudron C.282/8.

Development
To create room for a stretcher and attendant the earlier Caudron C.282/8 design was modified with a lengthened fuselage, an improved wing and tailplane design. A single-engined high-wing monoplane, the Pélican had a conventional landing gear. As a touring aircraft the Pélican could carry three passengers and a total of 62 were built as both air ambulances and tourers.

Operators

Force Publique

French Air Force

Specifications (Ambulance)

Notes

Bibliography

1930s French civil utility aircraft
C.510
High-wing aircraft
Single-engined tractor aircraft
Aircraft first flown in 1934